Holzwarth is a surname. Notable people with the surname include:

Alex Holzwarth (born 1968), German musician
Oliver Holzwarth, German musician

See also
Holzwarth Historic District, a historic ranch in Colorado, United States